Hilaroleopsis is a genus of longhorn beetles of the subfamily Lamiinae, containing the following species:

 Hilaroleopsis bicarinata (Bates, 1885)
 Hilaroleopsis coloratus Galileo & Martins, 2005
 Hilaroleopsis dimidiata (Bates, 1881)
 Hilaroleopsis globicollis (Bates, 1881)
 Hilaroleopsis icuapira Martins & Galileo, 1992
 Hilaroleopsis minor Martins & Galileo, 1997
 Hilaroleopsis nigerrima Aurivillius, 1923
 Hilaroleopsis obesa (Bates, 1881)
 Hilaroleopsis pituna Galileo & Martins, 2006
 Hilaroleopsis pluricostata (Bates, 1881)
 Hilaroleopsis theurgus Martins & Galileo, 2004
 Hilaroleopsis vogti Lane, 1970

References

Hemilophini